Melunović is a Serbian surname. Notable people with the surname include:

Alen Melunović (born 1990), Serbian footballer
Elvir Melunović (born 1979), Swiss footballer
Ermin Melunović (born 1973), former Serbian footballer

Serbian surnames
Slavic-language surnames
Patronymic surnames